Fernando Ocaranza Carmona (Mexico City, 1876 – Mexico City, 1965) was a Mexican surgeon, rector of the Universidad Nacional Autónoma de México (UNAM), and military in the rank of a Coronel (MC).

Ocaranza, son of Ramón Ocaranza and his wife Antonia Carmona, visited the Instituto Científico y Literario de Toluca, studied at the Escuela Práctica Médico Militar, and graduated at the Escuela Nacional de Medicina. Reportedly he passed his practical training in the Guaymas Municipal Hospital, in the Hospital de la Cruz Roja (Red Cross Hospital), in the military hospital and in the General Hospital in Mexico City. In 1901 he married Loreto Esquer, who gave birth to their son José, who also studied medicine.

Fernando Ocaranza himself graduated in 1909, became director of the Institute of Biology. After 1915 he lectured, was professor of physiology at the Escuela Médico Militar and at the Escuela Nacional de Medicina, where he was also secretary general from 1921 to 1923, and director from 1924 to 1934. Furthermore, he was professor at the Escuela Nacional de Altos Estudios (ENEA). On November 26, 1934, he became rector of the UNAM, and held the office until September 17, 1935. In 1945 he became a member of the university council, and was retired from the army in 1947. In 1949 he became honorary doctor of the UNAM.

Publications 
 1931: Lecciones de Biología General
 1933-1934: Capítulos de Historia Franciscana
 1934: El imperial colegio de indios de la Santa Cruz de Santiago Tlaltelolco, Colegio de Santa Cruz de Tlaltelolco
 1939: Crónica de las Provincias Internas de la Nueva España in The Hispanic American Historical Review, vol. 20, No. 1, pp. 138–139
 1940: Fisiología Humana
 1940: Novela de un Médico (autobiography)
 1943: La tragedia de un Rector (autobiography)

External links

References

Mexican surgeons
Academic staff of the National Autonomous University of Mexico
Mexican military doctors
Mexican soldiers
Academic staff of Escuela Médico Militar
1876 births
1965 deaths
20th-century Mexican physicians
20th-century Mexican military personnel
20th-century surgeons